Julius Sachs (July 6, 1849 – February 2, 1934) was an American educator, founder of the Sachs Collegiate Institute who belongs to the Goldman–Sachs family of bankers.

Sachs was born on July 6, 1849, in Baltimore. After taking his A.B. at Columbia in 1867 and his A.M. in 1871, he studied at several European universities. He was awarded a Ph.D. in 1871 by the University of Rostock. He married Rosa Goldman, daughter of investment banker Marcus Goldman, in 1874.

He founded Sachs School for Boys in 1872, and served as the school's principal for 32 years. He also founded the Sachs School for Girls, which he directed for 18 years. He was elected president of the American Philological Association for 1890-91, the first Jew to serve in that post. After he was appointed Professor of Education at Teachers College, Columbia University, the schools were discontinued.

At Sachs Collegiate Institute and Columbia University, Sachs tutored many students who later became distinguished figures in American life, such as Herbert H. Lehman, Irving Lehman, Walter Lippmann, and Hans Zinsser.

He retired from teaching in 1917 with the title of professor emeritus.

Inspired by Julius' brother Bernard Sachs, Julius' son Ernest Sachs became a notable physician.

References

External links
 

People from Baltimore
American people of German-Jewish descent
Columbia University alumni
Teachers College, Columbia University faculty
1849 births
1934 deaths
University of Rostock alumni